The 2020–21 NJIT Highlanders men's basketball team represented the New Jersey Institute of Technology in the 2020–21 NCAA Division I men's basketball season. The Highlanders, led by fifth-year head coach Brian Kennedy, played their home games at the Wellness and Events Center in Newark, New Jersey as first-year members of the America East Conference. In a season limited by the ongoing COVID-19 pandemic, they finished the season 7–12, 6–10 in America East play to finish in eighth place. They lost to Albany in the first round of the America East tournament.

Previous season
The Highlanders finished the 2019–20 season 9–21, 6–10 in ASUN play to finish in eighth place. They lost in the quarterfinals of the ASUN tournament to Liberty.

This was the final season the Highlanders were a member of the ASUN. On June 14, 2020, it was announced that they would become a full member of the America East Conference beginning July 1.

Roster

Schedule and results
On November 25, 2020, NJIT paused activities following positive Covid-19 tests and canceled all non-conference games that the school had not yet announced. 

|-
!colspan=12 style=| Regular season

|-
!colspan=12 style=| America East regular season

|-
!colspan=12 style=| America East tournament
|-

Source

References

NJIT Highlanders men's basketball seasons
NJIT Highlanders
NJIT Highlanders men's basketball
NJIT Highlanders men's basketball